Echinophthiriidae is a family of lice in the suborder Anoplura, the sucking lice. This family of lice are parasites of seals and the river otter, and are the only insects that infest aquatic hosts.

These lice have adaptations influenced by the anatomy of their hosts. Because some marine mammals, such as fur seals, have a layer of air trapped under their waterproof coats that insulates them against cold water, their lice actually live in a mostly dry, warm habitat. Other mammals have blubber for insulation, so their skin is in contact with the water; their lice parasites live in a cold aquatic environment.

Lice in this family have a chaetotaxy characterized by three kinds of setae: spines, scales, and hairs. Different species have different arrangements of these setae. Species also have various egg-laying habits, with some laying them singly or in clusters, and some cementing them to the hairs of the host animal. These lice have antennae but no eyes. In most species the middle and rear pairs of legs are larger with blunt claws while the front pair of legs is smaller with pointed claws. Scanning electron microscope examination shows that the species Antarctophthirus microchir uses its larger middle and rear pairs of legs to cling to the hairs of its host, and the smaller, pointed front legs are probably sensory structures.

Depending on species and temperature, the life cycle of one of these lice can take about 2 to 4 weeks. Each species tends to favor a different part of the host animal's body; for example, Antarctophthirus ogmirhini lives on the back flippers and tail and Lepidophthirus macrorhini favors the flippers, including the digits and the webbing between them. Proechinophthirus fluctus lives under the fur, while Antarctophthirus callorhini prefers parts with naked skin, such as the nostrils and eyelids of the host. Lice may serve as intermediate hosts or vectors for parasites of their hosts. Echinophthirius horridus is an intermediate host of Dipetalonema spirocauda, a nematode parasite of harbour seals.

There are 13 species classified in 5 genera. Taxa and their host animals include:
Genus Antarctophthirus
Antarctophthirus callorhini (on fur seals)
Antarctophthirus carlinii (on the Weddell seal)
Antarctophthirus lobodontis (on earless seals)
Antarctophthirus mawsoni (on earless seals)
Antarctophthirus microchir (on sea lions)
Antarctophthirus ogmirhini (on earless seals)
Antarctophthirus trichechi (on walruses)
Genus Echinophthirius, one species:
Echinophthirius horridus (on earless seals)
Genus Latagophthirus, one species:
Latagophthirus rauschi (on the river otter)
Genus Lepidophthirus, two species on the river otter:
Lepidophthirus macrorhini
Lepidophthirus piriformis
Genus Proechinophthirus, two species on fur seals and sea lions:
Proechinophthirus fluctus
Proechinophthirus zumpti

References

Further reading
Aznar, F. J., et al. (2009). Population dynamics of Antarctophthirus microchir (Anoplura: Echinophthiriidae) in pups from South American sea lion, Otaria flavescens, in Northern Patagonia. Parasitology 136(03), 293-303.
Kim, K. C. (1979). Life stages and population of Proechinophthirus zumpti (Anoplura: Echinopththiriidae), from the Cape fur seal (Arctocephalus pusillus). J Med Ent 16(6) 497-501.

Lice
Insect families